Stony Brook Branch is a tributary of the Stony Brook in Mercer County, New Jersey in the United States.

Course

Sister tributaries
Baldwins Creek
Duck Pond Run
Honey Branch
Lewis Brook
Peters Brook
Woodsville Brook

See also
List of rivers of New Jersey

References

External links
USGS Coordinates in Google Maps

Tributaries of the Raritan River
Rivers of New Jersey
Rivers of Mercer County, New Jersey